Donnie Allison (born September 7, 1939) is an American former driver on the NASCAR Grand National/Winston Cup circuit, who won ten times during his racing career, which spanned from 1966 to 1988. He is part of the "Alabama Gang", and is the brother of 1983 champion Bobby Allison and uncle of Davey Allison and Clifford Allison. He was inducted in the International Motorsports Hall of Fame in 2009.

NASCAR career
Before racing in the Grand National Series, Allison drove modified stock cars like his brother Bobby. Allison managed to get ten wins in NASCAR Cup Series competition with his first coming at the 1968 Carolina 500 at Rockingham Speedway and his final at the 1978 Dixie 500 at Atlanta Motor Speedway. Allison would suffer serious injuries at the 1981 Coca-Cola 600, this would end his career in NASCAR for the most part. Allison would only race fourteen more Winston Cup races (he would also fail to qualify four times for races during this time) from 1982 to 1988. Allison also won the 1967 NASCAR Grand National Rookie of the Year.

1979 Daytona 500
Allison possibly is most remembered for his involvement in a final-lap crash and a subsequent fight with Cale Yarborough in the 1979 Daytona 500. He was leading the race on the final lap with Yarborough drafting him tightly. As Yarborough started to go below Allison, he attempted to take the inside lane away but Yarborough hit Allison from behind first and got Allison sideways. Yarborough made contact with the side of Allison's car and it put him in the grass. He came back to hit Allison side to side and as both drivers tried to regain control, their cars made contact several times and finally locked together and crashed into the outside wall in turn 3. After the cars settled in the infield grass, Allison and Yarborough were in a heated conversation when, Bobby Allison, who finished laps down after his earlier collision with his brother, pulled over and to check on his brother, but Yarborough accused him of causing the accident and started to hit Bobby while Bobby was still in his car. At that point, a fight ensued. As the 1979 Daytona 500 was the first live flag-to-flag nationally televised NASCAR race, the finish and the post-race squabble were a ratings dream for CBS. Richard Petty, who was over half a lap behind at the time of the crash, went on to win the race. The fight made headlines all across America. The publicity was instrumental in the growth of NASCAR.

USAC career
Allison first raced in the USAC Championship Car Series in 1970. Driving the No. 83 Greer Eagle 67-Offenhauser for Ansted-Thompson Racing in the 1970 Indianapolis 500, he finished 4th and won the 1970 Indianapolis 500 Rookie of the Year Award. He would have finished 20th in points, but because he was using a NASCAR license, he was ineligible for points. For the 1971 Allison drove the No. 84 Purolator Filters Coyote-Ford V8, finishing 6th in the Indianapolis 500. He also competed in the Rex Mays 150 at Milwaukee State Fairgrounds Speedway, the Schaefer 500 at Pocono International Raceway, and the California 500 at Ontario Motor Speedway, retiring from both. Allison was again ineligible for points.
Allison held a twenty three year record for the Indianapolis 500 as the highest finishing Rookie from 1970 until 1993 when Nigel Mansell gained the title and broke his record.

After racing
Allison, who lives in Alabama and North Carolina, has been a television and radio commentator; has also been involved in his sons' Ronald, Donald and Kenny Allison's "Allison Brothers Race Cars" and the "Allison Legacy Race Series" as a consultant to the series and to many up and coming race drivers such as Joey Logano, Trevor Bayne, Regan Smith, John Hunter Nemechek and several others

Awards
1967 NASCAR Grand National Rookie of the Year
1968 NASCAR Most Popular Driver Grand Touring Division (Baby Grand) 
1970 Stark and Wetzel Indianapolis 500 Rookie of the Year
1970 NASCAR Most Popular Driver Late Model Sportsman Division
Inducted into the Alabama Sports Hall of Fame   in 1999 
Inducted into the Florida Sports Hall of Fame in 2000 
Inducted into the Stock Car Racing Hall of Fame in 2001
Inducted into the Alabama Auto Racing Pioneers in 2005 
Inducted into the International Motorsports Hall of Fame in 2009
Inducted into the Motorsports Hall of Fame of America in 2011
Inducted into the Augusta Raceway Preservation Society in 2017
Inducted into the National Motorsports Press Association Hall of Fame in 2018
Inducted into the Talladega-Texaco Walk of Fame

Motorsports career results

NASCAR
(key) (Bold – Pole position awarded by qualifying time. Italics – Pole position earned by points standings or practice time. * – Most laps led.)

Grand National Series

Winston Cup Series

Daytona 500

Busch Series

International Race of Champions
(key) (Bold – Pole position. * – Most laps led.)

American open-wheel racing
(key) (Races in bold indicate pole position)

USAC Championship Car

Indianapolis 500

References

Where Are They Now Article

External links

Donnie Allison: As I Recall... by Donnie Allison with Jimmy Creed, published by Sports Publishing L.L.C., 2005

1939 births
Living people
Racing drivers from Miami
People from Hueytown, Alabama
Racing drivers from Alabama
Indianapolis 500 drivers
Indianapolis 500 Rookies of the Year
NASCAR drivers
International Race of Champions drivers
American Speed Association drivers
International Motorsports Hall of Fame inductees
Alabama Gang
A. J. Foyt Enterprises drivers
Team Penske drivers